Belichan is an urban locality (an urban-type settlement) in Susumansky District of Magadan Oblast, Russia. Population:

Geography
Belichan is located in the Upper Kolyma Highlands by the Byoryolyokh river.

References

Urban-type settlements in Magadan Oblast